Jeremy Kyle (born 7 July 1965) is an English broadcaster and writer. He is known for hosting the tabloid talk show The Jeremy Kyle Show on ITV from 2005 to 2019. He also hosted a US version of his eponymous show, which ran for two seasons beginning in 2011. In 2022, Kyle became a presenter for TalkRadio and TalkTV.

Early life
Kyle was born in Reading, Berkshire, and is of Scottish descent. His father was an accountant and personal secretary to the Queen Mother for forty years. Kyle has claimed that his older brother, Nick, has experienced drug addiction.

He attended the Reading Blue Coat School, a boys' private school in Sonning, Berkshire.

Kyle's first job was at Marks & Spencer. He studied History and Sociology at the University of Surrey in Guildford.

Radio
From 1986 to 1995, Kyle worked as a life insurance salesman, recruitment consultant, and radio advertising salesman. He then became a radio presenter and after working at Orchard FM in Taunton, Somerset, and Leicester Sound in Leicester, he was signed by Kent's Invicta FM in 1996. In 1997, he joined BRMB in Birmingham, presenting the shows Late & Live and Jezza's Jukebox.

In 2000, Kyle moved to the Century FM network, taking this format with him. The show was called Jezza's Confessions. It was broadcast between 9pm and 1am. He won a Sony Award for Late & Live in 2001. On 1 July 2002, he made his first broadcast on Virgin Radio, presenting Jezza's Virgin Confessions every weekday from 8pm to midnight. In mid-2003, he broadcast the show from 9pm to 1am every weekday, and in January 2004 the show went out from 10pm to 1am, Sunday to Thursday. He left Virgin Radio in June 2004. From 5 September 2004, Kyle presented the Confessions show on London's Capital FM. The new programme aired Sunday to Thursday from 10pm to 1am with live calls on relationship issues of all kinds. Capital Confessions came to an end on 22 December 2005 to make way for The Jeremy Kyle Show, a similar show which ran from January 2006 to December 2006.

In late 2007, Kyle began a new show ("The Jeremy Kyle Show"), broadcasting across GCap Media's One Network, of which Orchard FM, Invicta FM and BRMB, his previous employers, were a part. The programme differed from his previous shows in that he interviewed celebrities. Kyle also began broadcasting a new programme, on Essex FM, in November 2007. Kyle joined Talksport on 21 September 2008 to present a lunchtime sports show every Sunday called The Jeremy Kyle Sunday Sports Show. As a result of Talksport's Premiership coverage on a Sunday, Kyle's show was cancelled, and he left the station.

Television
In 2005, Kyle moved his format to ITV with a programme also entitled The Jeremy Kyle Show. Members of his production team later accused Kyle of looking down on his guests. He was recorded referring to participants on his show that day as “thick as shit”.

In September 2007, Manchester judge Alan Berg described the show as "trash" which existed to "titillate bored members of the public with nothing better to do".

In February 2008, The Jeremy Kyle Show was again criticised in court after a man who found out during the recording of a show that he was not the father of his wife's child later pointed an air rifle at her. Other shows Kyle is involved with include Kyle's Academy, a ten-part series for ITV daytime which first aired on 18 June 2007. A team of experts (life coaches and psychotherapists), headed by Kyle, takes five people and works with them over an intensive fortnight to help them on the road to a happier more fulfilled life. Kyle has also presented Half Ton Hospital, a show about morbidly obese people in the United States.

On 19 April 2011, Kyle began presenting a documentary series called Military Driving School, where he visited the Defence School of Transport at Leconfield in East Yorkshire, following a group of new recruits as they undergo training as front line military drivers. In 2011, he was the presenter of the ITV game show High Stakes.

In 2015 & 2019, Kyle has presented two series of The Kyle Files, a primetime show on ITV.

In 2015, he fronted a ten-part daytime series called Jeremy Kyle's Emergency Room. The show returned for a second series in March 2016.

From March 2016 until August 2018 Kyle relief presented ITV's breakfast programme Good Morning Britain.

In May 2019, the recording and broadcasting of The Jeremy Kyle Show was suspended after a guest committed suicide shortly after appearing in an episode of the series. A review of the episode occurred before any resumption of the programme's transmission, and on 15 May 2019, ITV confirmed that the series had ceased production with immediate effect.   It has since been revealed that more guests had taken their own lives following their appearances in this and another programme hosted by Kyle on Channel 5, Britain's Worst Husband.

Kyle began developing a new show for ITV three months after his show was cancelled. ITV's director of television Kevin Lygo said a pilot episode was being made with Kyle, but the new show would not air in The Jeremy Kyle Show'''s old timeslot.

In early September 2021, it was announced that Kyle would present TalkRadio Drivetime between Monday and Thursday. The show started on 13 September. In April 2022, he announced his return to television to present a primetime show for TalkTV.

Personal life

He stated in his book I'm Only Being Honest, published in 2009, that he has obsessive–compulsive disorder.

Kyle's first marriage to Kirsty Rowley in 1989 was short-lived because of his addiction to gambling, which made him accumulate a debt which peaked at £12,000, and took some years to pay off. He married Carla Germaine in 2002. The couple separated amicably in 2015; they had three children. Their divorce was confirmed the following February. Kyle also has a daughter from his first marriage.

In late 2012, Kyle was diagnosed with testicular cancer. He received chemotherapy and underwent surgery to remove the affected testicle.

In February 2018, Kyle announced his engagement to Vicky Burton, his children's former nanny. They eventually married.

In 2021, Kyle stated that he had been diagnosed with an anxiety disorder after The Jeremy Kyle Show'' was axed.

Filmography

References

External links
 The Jeremy Kyle Show at itv.com
 

1965 births
Living people
Alumni of the University of Surrey
English radio DJs
English television presenters
English television talk show hosts
People educated at Reading Blue Coat School
People from Canning Town
People from Reading, Berkshire
People with obsessive–compulsive disorder
Virgin Radio (UK)
English people of Scottish descent